Ernest James Dixon (born October 17, 1971) is a former professional American football linebacker in the National Football League. He played six seasons for the New Orleans Saints, the Oakland Raiders, and the Kansas City Chiefs.

1971 births
Living people
People from York, South Carolina
Players of American football from South Carolina
American football linebackers
South Carolina Gamecocks football players
New Orleans Saints players
Oakland Raiders players
Kansas City Chiefs players